Nathan Wei Chen (Chinese: Chén Wēi, 陈巍, born May 5, 1999), is an American figure skater and author. He is the 2022 Olympic champion, a three-time World champion (2018, 2019, 2021), the 2017 Four Continents champion, a three-time Grand Prix Final champion (2017, 2018, 2019), a ten-time Grand Prix medalist (8 golds, 1 silver, 1 bronze), a 2022 Olympic silver medalist in the team event, a 2018 Olympic bronze medalist in the team event and a six-time U.S. national champion (2017–22). At the junior level, Chen is the 2015–16 Junior Grand Prix Final champion, 2013–14 Junior Grand Prix Final bronze medalist, 2014 World Junior bronze medalist, and a six-time Junior Grand Prix medalist (5 golds, 1 silver).

Regarded as one of the greatest figure skaters of all time, Chen had a win streak lasting more than three years from 2018 to 2021 in one of the most dominant four year stretches in the history of the sport. Recognized for performing the most technically difficult programs in the world, Chen is credited for pushing the boundaries of athletic ability in the sport and is affectionately known as the "Quad King" for his mastery of quadruple jumps. Chen is the first skater in history to have landed five types of quadruple jumps in competition (Toe loop, Salchow, Loop, Flip, and Lutz), the first skater to have landed 6 quadruple jumps in a free skate as well as the first skater to have landed eight quadruple jumps across a single competition. He has broken world and national records multiple times and is the current world record holder for men in the short program, free skate and combined total score under the ISU Judging System. Chen is the first Asian American man to earn an Olympic medal in single skating. At 17, he became the youngest U.S. champion since Dick Button in 1946 and five years later in 2022, he was the first man to win six U.S. titles in a row since Button (1946-52). At the 2018 World Championships, Chen became the youngest world champion since Evgeni Plushenko in 2001, and in 2021, he became the first U.S. man to win three consecutive world titles since Scott Hamilton (1982-1984). 

Chen was nominated for a Laureus World Sports Award and named Most Valuable Skater at the 2023 edition of the ISU Skating Awards. He was also included in the prestigious Time 100 list of the 100 most influential people in the world in 2022, as well as business magazine Forbes' 2020 30 Under 30 Sports list, and was announced as one of Harper's Bazaar's Icons of 2022. Additionally, in 2022, he was nominated for an ESPY Award, a People's Choice Award, and a James E. Sullivan Award.

Early life
Nathan Wei Chen was born in Salt Lake City, Utah, to Chinese immigrant parents, Zhidong Chen, a research scientist originating from Laibin, Guangxi, and Hetty Wang from Beijing. He has four older siblings named Alice, Tony, Colin, and Janice Chen, formerly of the Jennifer Doudna lab and co-founder of Mammoth Biosciences. Chen's mother was very involved in his skating career from the beginning and financed his skating endeavors as well as the pursuits of his older brothers and sisters by working as a medical translator and cleaning houses. Chen was a bit more active and fearless, always trying to copy his siblings. When he was five, he stood near the door of his rink and sang “The Star-Spangled Banner,” as he had seen swimmer Michael Phelps do during a medal ceremony at the 2004 Summer Olympics, pretending he had won a gold medal.    

In order to build up coordination and strength to supplement his skating, Chen's mother enrolled him in gymnastics and ballet classes. He trained with Ballet West Academy for more than six years and competed in gymnastics at the state level, placing first in the all-around at the Utah Boys’ State Gymnastics Championships in St. George in 2008. Chen was also an accomplished pianist as a child, winning local competitions in his age group, and more recently picked up the guitar as an extracurricular activity.

Competitive skating career

Early career 
Chen was part of a baby skater boom following the 2002 Winter Olympics in his home town. He started skating in a pair of his sister's white skates at age 3 in his first coach Stephanee Grosscup's beginner class at a new rink in the Salt Lake City Sports Complex, which served as a practice rink during the Olympics. He entered his first figure skating competition in 2003. From age 7, he started competing at the U.S. Junior Figure Skating Championships at the juvenile and intermediate levels. He placed 10th in juveniles in 2007, won bronze in juveniles in 2008, and captured the intermediate men's silver medal in 2009. Moving up to novice in the 2009–10 season, he competed at the 2010 U.S. Senior Championships in Spokane and became the youngest U.S. novice men's champion in history at the age of 10. Due to his young age, he remained at the novice level for the 2010–11 season and repeated as novice champion at the 2011 U.S. Championships in Greensboro, finishing almost 36 points ahead of his nearest competitor in the final standings. Chen debuted as a junior domestically in 2011-12 and won his first national junior men's title at the 2012 U.S. Championships in San Jose. Making his first international appearance, he won the novice men's event at the 2012 Gardena Spring Trophy in Italy.

During the early years of his career, Chen had started working with former Czechoslovakian skater Karel Kovar in Ogden. Kovar used to train with renowned Russian figure skating coach Alexei Mishin and taught Chen to pull his arms across his torso in a "seat belt" position when he rotated, a position Chen still uses to this day. Kovar introduced Chen to fellow Czechoslovakian skater Jozef Sabovčík nicknamed "Jumping Joe". Sabovčík was the first coach who told Chen not to stop in the middle of a program during a run-through. Chen worked with Kovar until age 9 but had also begun taking lessons from Genya Chernyshova who was local to Salt Lake City and more easily accessible. He started working with jump specialist Rafael Arutyunyan when he was 10, and he and his mother would make the long drive from Salt Lake City to Lake Arrowhead in California several times a year. The family didn't have a lot of money to spend on skates, lessons and competition costumes, so Chen and his mother sometimes slept in the car. Chen's mother would pay Arutyunyan for lessons, and Arutyunyan would give the money back to Chen who sometimes tried to give it back to Arutyunyan by stuffing it in the coach's pocket before running away. Then one day, at 11 years old, he said, "Mom, if we do not move I will not make it," and Chen's parents decided to split up the family with Chen and his mother relocating to Southern California. Arutyunyan became his main coach in December 2011.

Junior career 
Chen became age-eligible to compete in the ISU Junior Grand Prix in 2012-13 and made his debut in Austria where he secured the title with the combined total score of 222.00 with 37 points to spare. He withdrew from his second event in Croatia after sustaining a lower leg injury but went on to win the junior men's bronze medal at the 2013 U.S. Championships. In 2013-14, Chen placed first at both Grand Prix assignments in Mexico and Belarus and qualified for the 2013 Junior Grand Prix Final where he came third. He won his second U.S. junior title with a record cumulative score of 223.93 at the 2014 U.S. Championships, and captured the bronze at the 2014 World Junior Championships a few months later. 

The 2014-15 was a season plagued by injuries and Chen was only healthy enough to compete at one Grand Prix event in Croatia where he finished second behind Shoma Uno. He debuted as a senior domestically by winning the 2015 Pacific Sectional Championships and advanced to the 2015 US Championship. A week before his senior national debut, he developed a growth-related heel injury and competed with modified versions of both programs. He placed eighth overall. After nationals, Chen was assigned to the 2015 World Junior Championships where he placed 4th. In 2015-16, Chen stood atop the podium at the Junior Grand Prix Final after winning both Grand Prix events in Colorado Springs and Logroño. The following month, Chen made history at the 2016 U.S. Championships by becoming the first U.S. man to land two quadruple jumps in a short program as well as four quadruple jumps in a long program. He finished third overall behind Adam Rippon and Max Aaron, the former not attempting any quads and the latter landing two. This reignited the long-standing debate over whether artistry should trump athleticism. While attempting a quadruple toe loop in the exhibition, Chen sustained an avulsion injury to his left hip and underwent surgery. He withdrew from the 2016 World Junior Championships as well as the 2016 World Championships. After a month of rehabilitation at the U.S. Olympic Training Center in Chula Vista, he went to the U.S. Olympic Training Center in Colorado Springs to work with strength and conditioning specialists and continued his rehabilitation. He didn't resume full training till around July.

Senior career

2016–2017 season: Senior international debut, Four Continents title & first senior national title
In preparation for his senior international debut, Chen worked on a new short program with Marina Zoueva, and by September, Zoueva and Oleg Epstein were coaching him in Canton. Chen opened the pre-Olympic season at 2016 CS Finlandia Trophy by winning gold ahead of training mate Patrick Chan. At his senior Grand Prix debut at 2016 Trophée de France, he landed clean quadruple lutz and triple toe combinations and clean quadruple flips in both segments, receiving 92.85 points for the short program and breaking Evan Lysacek‘s long standing U.S. record of 90.30. He ended up fourth overall and returned to California to work with Arutyunyan before NHK Trophy where he finished second behind Olympic champion Yuzuru Hanyu. Chen opened the 2016-17 Grand Prix Final by placing 5th in the short program but won the free skate with a performance that included four quadruple jumps, earning a total combined score of 282.85 points, that was enough for silver behind Hanyu. At 17, he became the second-youngest man to medal at a Grand Prix Final after Evgeni Plushenko who was 16 in 1999.

At the 2017 U.S. Championships in Kansas City, Chen performed two quadruple jumps in the short program and made history by becoming the first skater in the world to land five clean quadruple jumps in a free s He won his first senior U.S. title with record scores (106.39 in the short program, 212.08 in the free skate, 318.47 overall) to become the youngest champion in more than 5 decades. A few weeks later, Chen won the 2017 Four Continents Championships. He scored 103.12 in the short program, 204.34 in the free skate, and 307.46 in combined total, breaking the 100 (short program), 200 (free skate) and 300 (combined total) barriers for the first time in his career, and became the youngest Four Continents men's champion in history (until Kao Miura's win in 2023). When the 2017 World Championships rolled around, the boots that Chen had begun using were on the verge of falling apart but he felt his back-up boots were too new and decided to try to solve with duct tape and hockey laces. Chen finished sixth overall and felt disappointed. "It wasn’t at all the program I wanted to do. I made a whole bunch of mistakes," he remarked. Chen's placement, however, combined with teammate Jason Brown’s seventh-place finish, ensured that Team USA would be able to send three men to the 2018 Winter Olympics. Chen capped off the season at the 2017 World Team Trophy where he finished second in the short program and fourth in the free skate. The U.S. team finished third overall.

2017–2018 season: Pyeongchang Olympics & first World title
Chen's first competition in the Olympic season was 2017 CS U.S. International Figure Skating Classic. Working with choreographers Shae-Lynn Bourne and Lori Nichol, he debuted a short program set to "Nemesis" and free skate with music from "Mao's Last Dancer". He landed his first quad loop in the free to become the first skater in history to land five different quads in competition. After placing first in the short program and second in the free at 2017 Rostelecom Cup, he defeated Yuzuru Hanyu to win his first Grand Prix title. At 2017 Skate America, Chen secured his second title, finishing ahead of teammate Adam Rippon. With the two wins, Chen earned the top qualifying spot for the 2017-18 Grand Prix Final, where he had a narrow victory over Shoma Uno, and became the first U.S. man to win the final since Evan Lysacek in 2009. At the 2018 U.S. Championships serving as trials for the Olympics, Chen performed a total of seven clean quadruple jumps (two in the short program and five in the free skate) to win his second consecutive national title. Afterward, Chen, Adam Rippon and Vincent Zhou were named to the Olympic Team.At the 2018 Winter Olympics in Pyoengchang, Chen performed poorly in the men's short program in the team event and placed fourth but would eventually go on to win the bronze alongside his U.S. teammates. A week later, Chen had another disappointing performance in the men's individual short program and finished seventeenth heading into the free skate. "Honestly, it was bad," he said afterward. "I made as many mistakes as I possibly could have." Chen placed first in the free skate with a new personal best score of 215.08 and made history by becoming the first skater to land six quads in a free skate. He finished fifth overall. After coming down with the flu, he withdrew from the gala and left Pyeongchang early to avoid infecting other athletes ahead of their competitions. A month later, in March, Chen won his first world title at the 2018 World Championships. He finished first in both programs and became the first skater in history to land eight quadruple jumps across a single competition, two in the short program and six in the free skate. He also became the first American man to win worlds since Evan Lysacek in 2009 and the youngest world champion since Evgeni Plushenko in 2001. His margin of victory over silver medalist Shoma Uno (47.63 points) was the greatest at a world championships, Olympic Winter Games and Grand Prix Final under the historical (before 2018-19) ISU Judging System (IJS). In the spring, Chen was accepted into Yale University. "Going to Yale next fall is the goal right now," he said. "I am going to Bulldog Days, where I will talk about everything and try to figure things out."

2018–2019 season: Second consecutive World title

Chen's first competition as a full-time college student was Japan Open alongside Jeremy Abbott, Bradie Tennell and Mariah Bell where he finished fourth in the free program with Team North America finishing third overall. At 2018 Skate America, Chen skated to "Caravan" by Fanfare Ciocărlia in his short program and "Land of All" by Woodkid in the free skate from the movie 'Desierto' about immigration into the U.S. He won both segments and defended his title, winning by the largest point margin in the history of the competition. At 2018 Internationaux de France, Chen fell on his quadruple flip in the short program and entered the free skate in third behind Jason Brown. He bounced back and won the event with a total score of 271.58. At the 2018–19 Grand Prix Final, Chen won both the short program and the free skate, albeit with mistakes, to collect his second Grand Prix Final title. The gold marked Chen the fourth man to win consecutive Grand Prix Final titles since the event debuted in 1995. At the 2019 U.S. Championships in Detroit, Chen received a record score of 113.42 for a two-quad short program and a record score of 228.80 for a four-quad free skate, totaling a record combined score of 342.22 points. He won the championship by 58.21 points over Vincent Zhou in second place and became the first man to win three straight national titles since Johnny Weir in 2004–2006. 

Competing at the 2019 World Championships in Saitama during Yale's spring break, Chen successfully defended his world title and broke the world record for the free skate and total score, with 216.02 and 323.42 points respectively. He won the championship by 22.45 points over Yuzuru Hanyu and became the first U.S. man to win back-to-back world titles since Scott Hamilton (1981-1984). With teammate Vincent Zhou bringing home the bronze, two Americans stood on the men's podium at Worlds for the first time since 1996, when Todd Eldredge won gold and Rudy Galindo took the bronze in Edmonton. Chen traveled back to Japan to conclude his season at 2019 World Team Trophy where he won both segments with Team USA placing first.

2019–2020 season: Third consecutive Grand Prix Final title

Chen opened his season by winning the free skate in the men's event at Japan Open, contributing to Team North America's bronze medal finish. He went on to defend his title at 2019 Skate America in Las Vegas which was the first time anyone had won Skate America three times consecutively since Todd Eldredge won four (1994-1997). The 44-point margin of victory was the largest ever in the history of the event. Two weeks later, Chen won his second straight Internationaux de France title in Grenoble and became the first singles skater since Evgeni Plushenko nearly two decades earlier to win eight straight Grand Prix events.

At the 2019-20 Grand Prix Final in Turin, Chen and Yuzuru Hanyu were expected to battle for gold and silver. Chen had a clean short program with a new personal best score of 110.38, 0.15 short of Hanyu's world record at the time. He went on to set new highest scores of 224.92 in the free skate, and 335.30 in the combined total, breaking his own world records in the two segments respectively, winning the title with 43.87 points over Hanyu. Suffering from the flu, Chen was only able to fully resume training less than two weeks before the 2020 U.S. Championships, where he captured his fourth national title with a new U.S. national short program record of 114.13, to become the first man to win four consecutive U.S. men's titles since Olympic champion Brian Boitano in 1988.  He was assigned to compete at the World Championships in Montreal, but these were canceled as a result of the coronavirus pandemic.

2020–2021 season: Third consecutive World title
With the pandemic still raging, skaters were largely assigned to the 2020-2021 Grand Prix based on geographic location, with Chen again set to compete at  Skate America. He won both the short program and the free skate, with a total score of 299.15, despite popping two planned jumps in the free. Afterward, speaking to Olympic Channel, Chen revealed that he was taking a break from school to focus on skating and the 2022 Winter Olympics. "(The Olympics) are the end goal," Chen said, "It's the driving force behind a lot of what we do and a lot of the decisions that we make." Chen made history at the 2021 U.S. Championships, winning his fifth consecutive national title. He became the first man to win five in a row since Dick Button's seven (1946-1952). Chen cited Button as inspiration. "It's incredible to try to follow in his footsteps," Chen said of Button. "It means the world. Dick is a true skating icon, and it just feels incredible to be trying to chase something that someone like that has done. I'm nowhere near the level he was at, but it's just cool to be able to be even mentioned in his sort of realm of legendness." During his free skate, Chen attempted five quads, landing four cleanly.

At the 2021 World Championships in Stockholm, Chen placed third after the short program with a score of 98.85 after a fall on the quadruple Lutz. He skated a clean free program with five quads and finished first with a score of 222.03. He won his third consecutive world title with a cumulative score of 320.88 and became the first man since Patrick Chan (2011–13) and the first American (male or female) since Scott Hamilton (1982–84) to win three world titles in a row. In a post-competition interview, Chen said he felt he had grown since the 2018 Olympics when he was seventeenth after the short program: "I think having had that experience now going into this competition, it definitely helps me retain some resiliency, I think. And I think that definitely, you know, thankfully came into play today." Chen finished his season at the 2021 World Team Trophy in Osaka where he placed first in both segments, with Team USA securing the silver overall.

2021–2022 season: Olympic gold medal
Chen began the Olympic season at 2021 Skate America where he placed fourth in the short program. He fell on his first quadruple jump, and a poor landing on the second quadruple jump left him unable to execute the required two-jump combination. He placed second in the free skate despite doubling two of his six planned quads, finishing in third place overall behind Vincent Zhou and Shoma Uno. Speaking about the end of his undefeated run since the 2018 World Championships, Chen said, "it's not devastating. It was inevitably going to end as a winning streak at some point in time, and I am really proud of these guys up here." Chen rebounded a week later at 2021 Skate Canada International and won both segments to take home the gold with a 47.63 point margin over silver medalist Jason Brown. Chen's results secured him a place in the 2021-22 Grand Prix Final which was subsequently canceled due to restrictions prompted by the Omicron variant. At the end of November, Chen enlisted Massimo Scali to help provide finishing touches on the presentation of his Olympic programs. After initially skating to Benjamin Clementine's "Eternity" and Mozart, he had decided to return to his "La Bohème" short program and "Rocketman" free skate from 2019-20 but was unable to work with choreographer Marie-France Dubreull in person due to the ongoing pandemic. At the 2022 U.S. Championships, Chen won his sixth consecutive U.S. title, a feat only achieved by the legendary Dick Button 70 years earlier. He scored 115.39, a new national record, in the short program and 212.62 in the free skate for a combined total score of 328.01.

A month later, at the 2022 Winter Olympics in Beijing, Chen was the U.S. entry in the men's short program in the Olympic team event where he had delivered a subpar performance four years earlier. He skated clean and placed first with a new personal best of 111.71, securing ten points for Team USA. He remarked, "it feels great to have a short program I actually skated well, at an Olympic experience." The U.S. team would go on to win the silver medal, Chen's second Olympic medal. However, following a positive doping test of Russia's gold medalist Kamila Valieva, the team members were not awarded their medals, pending an investigation, which is still ongoing as of February 2023, a full year after the event took place. Two days later, Chen set a world record in the men's short program with a score of 113.97, topping the previous record of 111.82 set by Yuzuru Hanyu in 2020. Chen won Olympic gold with a free skate score of 218.63 that included five quads, finishing with a combined total score of 332.60. His free skate costume, designed by longtime collaborator New York based fashion designer Vera Wang, is now part of the permanent collections in the Smithsonian Institution's National Museum of American History. After the Olympics, Chen withdrew from the 2022 World Championships due to injury.

Show skating career

Chen started performing in ice shows from an early age and made appearances in televised shows such as Holiday On Ice: Las Vegas Style at age 5 in 2004 as well as "Supermen On Ice" at age 7 in 2006. After winning his record second novice title, he was invited to skate in shows all over the world such as China in 2010 and Thailand in 2011. Chen has also been performing in the annual Sun Valley summer shows in Idaho since he was a young boy, and made several appearances in Harvard's "An Evening with Champions" throughout the years.

Since his senior season, Chen has been a regular feature on Stars On Ice Japan, the US Stars On Ice tour, Dreams On Ice, and The ICE in Japan. In June 2019, Chen was cast in Yuna Kim’s show All That Skate which took place at the Olympic Park KSPO Dome in Seoul. The show was directed by lauded Canadian choreographers Sandra Bezic and David Wilson. He headlined the annual "Ice Spectacular" at Vail Skate Fest in Colorado a few days before Christmas in 2023, and is scheduled to star in Skating Club of Boston’s show Ice Chips "Full Throttle" in April 2023 as well as the US Stars On Ice tour in late May 2023.

Skating technique and style
Chen has been commended for his technical prowess and impact on the sport. 1984 Olympic Champion Scott Hamilton described him as being "cut from the same cloth as Dick Button, not being satisfied with the status quo and building his athleticism in a way nobody else previously had" but he combines the athleticism with "very significant artistic performances. Look at his arms, his hands, his carriage. It is all very fluid, not exaggerated, and everything has a purpose" and he is very "aware of the music", added 1956 Olympic Champion Hayes Jenkins. Cati Snarr of Ballet West where Chen trained as a kid remarked that Chen "has perfect placement (relative positioning of his torso, head and limbs), perfect turnout (hip rotation) and natural kinesthetic awareness that some kids never get," while 1980 Olympic Champion Robin Cousins observed that there is a "wonderful, joyous feeling about his skating." Chen's senior programs have been all over the musical landscape from classical warhorses Le Corsaire and the Polovtsian Dances to moody contemporary like Woodkid and Philip Glass, upbeat Elton John, Latin and pulsating Stravinsky.

Alexei Mishin sees fundamentals of the technique he teaches as part of the reason for Chen's consistency where the skater should have a very tight pulling-in position, start the rotation during take-off and rotate very quickly. Chen's rotation position has been used as a close example of what can be defined as the perfect air position. It is characterized by a vertical axis running through the long axis of his body without hunched shoulders or rounded back and no bend at the waist or the knees, and his arms are pulled tight across his torso like a seat belt. When Chen learnt this technique from his childhood coach and former Mishin student Karel Kovar, he also used to train in "Mishin's Magic Vest", a specially designed vest with sensors emitting beeping sounds when the skater achieves the correct arm position. The vest was developed by Mishin.

Public life and popular culture

Endorsements
According to Forbes, Chen had long-term deals with eleven partners including Bridgestone, Panasonic, Comcast, Nike, Toyota and Visa, as well as OMEGA, Coca-Cola, United Airlines and Kellogg's, and also worked with consumer brands like Grubhub, Airweave, and Invisalign. He appeared in crossover TV adverts for the 2022 theatrical film Jurassic World: Dominion with fellow Olympians Shaun White and Mikaela Shiffrin in addition to an array of other promotional pieces and content for other sponsors. Chen is a brand ambassador for Panasonic and fronted their "Green Impact" initiative alongside tennis player Naomi Osaka and Olympic swimmer Michael Phelps. The company enlisted the three celebrity athletes for its sustainability mission, and Chen made appearances for Panasonic at CES 2023 in Las Vegas, an annual tech conference organized by the Consumer Technology Association.

In 2021, he was part of luxury jewelry designer David Yurman's "My New York" social campaign and collaborated with them to create an exclusive bracelet benefiting AAPI non-profit collective Gold House. In January 2023, Chen was announced as one of the celebrity guests to be featured in the fifth season of "Time to Walk" on Apple Fitness Plus which is an audio walking experience produced by Apple that pairs music and inspirational monologues from famous musicians, athletes, and actors with exercise tracking. Other "Time to Walk" celebrity guests include Dolly Parton, actress Jamie Lee Curtis and singer Shawn Mendes. Chen has been represented by IMG since the beginning of his senior career.

Ambassadorships
The Salt Lake City-Utah Games Committee, bidding to bring the Olympic Winter Games back to Salt Lake City in 2030 or 2034, named Chen to its Athlete Advisory Committee alongside alpine skiers Lindsey Vonn and Ted Ligety, speed skater Apolo Ohno and others in June 2021. Chen said that "the developed infrastructure is already in place, so it makes a lot of sense to bring it back to Salt Lake City" and "having an Olympics in a home town of a lot of young athletes can be very inspiring."

Chen was announced as Goodwill Ambassador for the Lake Placid 2023 FISU World University Games, commonly known as Lake Placid 2023 and spearheaded Panasonic's "Green Impact" campaign at the International University Sports Federation's World Conference that was held in conjunction with the games. The theme of the conference was climate change.

Books and magazines
Chen's memoir One Jump at a Time: My Story was released by HarperCollins in November, 2022. The book follows Chen from childhood as the youngest son of Chinese American immigrants in the Salt Lake City area to his rise and the many challenges along the way in figure skating buoyed by the 2002 Olympic Winter Games in his hometown – including his family's determination to find the resources to pay for expensive training, his painful hip injury and subsequent surgery in 2016, and his disappointing fifth-place finish at the Olympic Winter Games in 2018. 

In February 2023, HarperCollins released Chen's first picture book Wei Skates On with illustrations by Lorraine Nam. The book tells the story about a young boy named Wei who learns to face his fears and find the joy in sports no matter the outcome. 

Chen will be featured in the children's book Who Is Nathan Chen? which will be released by Penguin Books in August 2023. The book is part of their bestselling book series Who Was? which includes more than 250 titles and has sold more than 20 million-plus copies worldwide. The series tells the stories of prominent figures and subjects, covering everything from sports to politics. 

Chen has appeared in multiple well-known fashion and news magazines such as Vogue, GQ, Harper's Bazaar, Time, Teen Vogue, Elle, Cosmopolitan, Glamour, and "Spur Magazine", as well as graced the covers of "World Figure Skating Magazine" and "International Figure Skating Magazine".

Television
Chen starred in three episodes of the Elton John produced "From the Top: Olympians and Rockstars" with singer-songwriter Hayley Kiyoko on the Olympic Channel in 2021, a show that paired Olympic athletes with music stars. John served as executive producer and noted that there "has long been an inextricable connection between music and sport, two worlds that often come together for cultural moments around the world". When Elton John and Britney Spears released the acoustic version of the John song "Hold Me Closer" on November 18, 2022, they also released an official music video starring Chen skating at Yale's Ingalls Rink commonly known as the "Whale." The seeds of collaboration between the duo began in 2019 when Chen first incorporated John's songs from the Oscar-winning motion picture "Rocketman" into his free program. In March 2023, Chen attended Elton John AIDS Foundation's 31st annual Academy Awards party in West Hollywood. 

In July 2022, Chen made an appearance as a creator on the American dance competition television series on NBC called Dancing With Myself in which one creator demonstrates a series of dance moves and each contestant must then perform those moves. He was featured in an episode of Secret Celebrity Renovation on CBS in August 2022, a show that gives celebrities the opportunity to gift a renovation to a person who helped guide them to success. For Chen, who has long acknowledged the many people who have helped him along the way, that meant gifting the Salt Lake City Sports Complex, that houses the rink where he took his first steps on the ice as a toddler, a new skater's lounge and dressing room. Chen dedicated the renovation to childhood coaches Stephanee Grosscup, Karel Kovar and Chenya Chernyshova. He went on to reunite with all four of his siblings to compete on the Steve Harvey-hosted game show Celebrity Family Feud against Marvel's Shang-Chi actor Simu Liu's team. The episode aired on ABC in August 2022.

Chen has made appearances on a variety of daytime television shows and late night talk shows such as the Today Show, The Late Late Show with James Corden, The Tonight Show Starring Jimmy Fallon, and Access Hollywood.

Philanthropic work and supported causes 
In the spring of 2022, Chen partnered with the U.S. Department of Health and Human Services to aid them in their public education initiative "We Can Do This", a campaign that aimed to promote the importance of COVID-19 vaccines, where he also got the opportunity to speak to immunologist and former NIAID director Dr. Anthony Fauci. Chen had been open about his anxiety before traveling to the 2021 World Championships in Stockholm in the midst of the pandemic.

As a supporter of the nonprofit collective Gold House that advances the interests and safety of people of Asian and Pacific Islander descent, Chen spoke out on violence against Asian Americans in March 2021 calling it "unacceptable". "I worry about my parents more so than myself. I don’t want them to go out in the park to walk and then get beat up or [have] worse things to happen to them," Chen said. On January 26, 2023, President Joe Biden acknowledged Chen during a speech at the White House where he was a guest at the President and First Lady Jill Biden's Lunar New Year reception.

Since 2017, Chen has been involved with Figure Skating in Harlem, a non-profit organization aiming to help girls of color transform their lives and grow in confidence, leadership and academic achievement. Chen was one of the honorees at the 25th gala event in 2022. In 2021, he supported StandUp for Kids which is a national non-profit program that strives to end youth homelessness. The organization has a branch in Orange County where Great Park Ice, Chen's training base, is located.

Following the U.S. Supreme Court's decision to overturn Roe vs. Wade in June 2022, Chen issued a statement on his social media supporting women's rights to choose and donated to the National Network of Abortion Funds.

Personal life and education 
Chen went to Hawthorne Elementary School in Salt Lake City and was accepted into the school district's extended learning program where he took classes one level above his grade level. He later attended West High School in Salt Lake City, Rim of the World High School in Lake Arrowhead, California, and graduated from high school from California Connections Academy. He earned admittance to Yale University in 2018 and enrolled at residential college Jonathan Edwards, selecting to major in statistics and data science. After his sophomore year, he took a leave of absence to prepare for the 2022 Winter Olympics but returned in the fall of 2022 to complete his undergraduate degree. As of January 2023, Chen hasn’t closed the door on competing at the 2026 Cortina-Milano Olympics. He said, “I have a lot of things that I’m engaged with but it’s not something that I’m like, ‘For sure, I don’t want to do that ever again.’ I want to maintain the option and just see how my body is doing, how my mind is doing, how my projects are doing.”

Records and achievements
Chen has set seven world record scores in the +5/-5 Grade of Execution (GOE) system, one in the short program, four in the free program, and four in the combined total score. He is the current world record holder in all three segments.

Honors and awards 

 Laureus World Sports Awards: Nominated for a Breakthrough of the Year Award (2023)

 International Skating Union (ISU): Won "Most Valuable Skater" (2023)
 Time Magazine: Named to the Time100 List (the 100 most influential people in the world) (2022)
 Time Magazine: Named to the Time Next Generation Leaders List (2017)
 Forbes: Named to the Forbes 30 Under 30 Sports list (2020)

 ESPY Awards: Nominated in the "Best Olympian, Men's Sports" category (2022)
 Harper's Bazaar: Named to their list of "Icons" (2022)
 People's Choice Awards: Nominated in the "Game Changer" category (2022)

 Amateur Athletic Union: Nominated for a James E. Sullivan Award (2022)

 Committee of 100: Recipient of the "Trailblazer Award for Commitment to Excellence" (2022)

 Gold House: A100 Honoree (2018, 2019 and 2020)
 Gold House: Inducted into the A100 Hall of Fame (2021)
 Sun Valley: Presented with a key to the city (2022)
 Utah: Awarded a proclamation, making May 18 "Nathan Chen Day" (2022)
 Salt Lake County: Awarded a proclamation, making May 16 "Nathan Chen Day" (2018)

 Professional Skaters Association: Won the "Gustave Lussi Award" (2019, 2021 and 2022)

 United States Olympic & Paralympic Committee: Named "Male Olympic Athlete of the Year" (2019)

 The Salt Lake Tribune: Nominated for "Utahn of the Year" (2022)
 SKATING Magazine: Recipient of the "Reader's Choice Award" (Michelle Kwan Trophy) (2016-17, 2017-18 and 2018-2019)
 ABC News: Named Person of the Week (February 19, 2010)
 U.S. Figure Skating: Recipient of the "Ron and Gayle Hershberger Award" (2012)
 U.S. Figure Skating: Recipient of the "Athlete Alumni Ambassador Award" (2011)
 U.S. Figure Skating: Recipient of the "Cecilia Colledge Memorial Fund Award" (2010 and 2011)

Programs

Competitive highlights

Detailed results

Senior level in +5/-5 GOE system

Senior level in +3/-3 GOE system

Junior level in +3/-3 GOE system

Novice level in +3/-3 GOE system

Bibliography

 240 p.
 40 p.

Notes and references

Citations

External links

 
 
 
 
 
 Nathan Chen at RinkResults
 

! colspan="3" style="border-top: 5px solid #78FF78;" |World Record Holders

1999 births
Living people
American male single skaters
American sportspeople of Chinese descent
Figure skaters from Salt Lake City
Figure skaters at the 2018 Winter Olympics
Figure skaters at the 2022 Winter Olympics
Season-end world number one figure skaters
Season's world number one figure skaters
Olympic bronze medalists for the United States in figure skating
Olympic silver medalists for the United States in figure skating
Olympic gold medalists for the United States in figure skating
Medalists at the 2018 Winter Olympics
Medalists at the 2022 Winter Olympics
World Junior Figure Skating Championships medalists
Four Continents Figure Skating Championships medalists
World Figure Skating Championships medalists